Klaudjo Dhespo (born 6 December 1994), known professionally as Toquel (stylised in all caps), is an Albanian rapper in Greece.

Life and career 

Toquel was born as Klaudjo Dhespo on 6 December 1994 into an Albanian family in the city of Tepelenë, Albania. His family moved from his native country to Heraklion, Greece, when he was 11 months old. During an interview in Greece, Dhespo stated that he experienced discrimination because of his Albanian origin.

Artistry and influences 

Dhespo's stage name, Toquel, was inspired by a therapist from Chania, Greece, who helped him to manage his panic attacks. He grew up listening to artists such as 50 Cent, Audio Two, Big L, Bone Thugs-n-Harmony, Dr. Dre, Eminem, Mobb Deep, Rakim, Snoop Dogg, The Notorious B.I.G., Tupac and Xzibit.

Discography

Albums

Singles

As lead artist

As featured artist

Other charted songs

References 

1994 births
21st-century Albanian rappers
Albanian expatriates in Greece
Albanian hip hop singers
Albanian rappers
Albanian-language singers
Modern Greek-language singers
Minos EMI artists
Living people
People from Heraklion
People from Tepelenë